Val-Bélair is a former city located near the St. Lawrence River in Quebec, Canada. It was amalgamated into Quebec City on January 1, 2002. More specifically, it is within the region of La Haute-Saint-Charles.

Population: 
(2001) 21,332
(2015) 23,798

See also
 Municipal reorganization in Quebec

Neighbourhoods in Quebec City
Former municipalities in Quebec
Populated places disestablished in 2002

es:Val-Bélair (Quebec)